The Power of Few is a 2013 American drama film directed, written and produced by Leone Marucci. The Power of Few was produced by Marucci through Steelyard Pictures with Q'orianka Kilcher and her company iQ Films.

Plot
It is a crime drama featuring five interconnected stories, set in New Orleans.

Cast
The film has an ensemble cast that includes Christopher Walken, Christian Slater, Q'orianka Kilcher, Anthony Anderson, Jesse Bradford, Moon Bloodgood, Nicky Whelan, Devon Gearhart, Juvenile, Navid Negahban, Jordan Prentice, and Derek Richardson.

Production
Marucci and Kilcher set out to make the production process "interactive", with The Power of Few website used to disclose many details of production, as well as to solicit audience feedback. From online casting to online editing, the global audience was provided original material from the film (and an online editing system) and invited to help create the finished film. The interactive collaboration continued beyond the website as the production ran a community outreach program in New Orleans during filming.

Release
The Power of Few debuted theatrically in the United States on February 14, 2013. Steelyard Pictures platform released the film theatrically starting in two markets and expanding to 40 markets throughout the spring of 2013. Gaiam Vivendi is distributing the film on all non-theatrical platforms.

References

External links

'The Power of Few' Makes Limited-Release Debut
'The Power of Few' Is Experimental in More Ways Than One
'Power of Few' pays off big
Interview: Moon Bloodgood talks 'The Power of Few'
Moon Bloodgood: Over The Moon with a New Baby, a New Film and The Power of Few - Exclusive 1:1
Hot Topic: Jesse Bradford

2013 films
American independent films
Hood films
Films set in New Orleans
2010s English-language films
2010s American films